Eilhard von Domarus (1893 – 1958) was German-born American psychiatrist. He played an important role in the development of the interdisciplinary study of philosophy and neurology. Warren McCulloch regarded him as the “great philosophic student of psychiatry.”

References

1893 births
1958 deaths
German emigrants to the United States